Three Canadian naval units have carried the name HMCS Miramichi.

 (I) was a Second World War  that served in the Royal Canadian Navy.
 (II) was a Bay-class minesweeper, commissioned in July 1954, paid off in October 1954 and sold to France.
 (III) was also a Bay-class minesweeper, commissioned in October 1957.

References

 Government of Canada Ships' Histories - HMCS Miramichi

Royal Canadian Navy ship names